Petrophila premalis is a moth in the family Crambidae first described by Herbert Druce in 1895. It is found in Mexico.

References

Moths described in 1895
Petrophila